Darren Watkins Jr. (born January 21, 2005), better known by his online alias IShowSpeed (or simply Speed), is an American YouTuber, streamer, and internet personality. He is known for his variety livestreams in which he primarily plays video games including Roblox, Fortnite, and FIFA. Watkins is noted for his oftentimes shocking behavior on live streams which has helped him gain a strong following while also placing him at the center of numerous controversies. 

Born and raised in Cincinnati, Ohio, Watkins registered his channel "IShowSpeed" in 2017, primarily posting gaming videos. From 2021 to 2022, he began gaining substantial popularity due in part to the circulation of eye-catching clips from his live streams on social media platforms. In 2022, he was named Breakout Streamer of the Year at the 12th Streamy Awards.

Life and career 
Darren Watkins Jr. was born on January 21, 2005, in Cincinnati, Ohio.

He joined YouTube in 2016, uploading gameplay videos occasionally. Around December 2017, Watkins began livestreaming and uploading videos of games such as NBA 2K and Fortnite, but only managed to average two viewers. Eventually, his subscriber count saw a rise in the span of a few months, reaching 100 thousand subscribers in April 2021, 1 million in June 2021, and 10 million in July 2022.

Influencer career 
Watkins began streaming in 2019. He became prominent in 2021 after his fanbase began posting clips on TikTok of his often-violent behavior during live streams towards games, players, and his camera, which gained popularity and became memes. His outbursts have resulted in bans from the streaming platform Twitch and the video game Valorant. Kotaku described Watkins as "one of the biggest and fastest-rising streamers" on YouTube. A game that has majorly contributed to his growth in popularity is Talking Ben. Watkins' videos on Talking Ben the Dog were credited for bringing the mobile app newfound popularity, with it becoming the best-selling game on the App Store over a decade after its initial release.

In July 2022, Watkins set off a Pikachu firework inside of his bedroom, almost burning it down. In August 2022, he was swatted while livestreaming on YouTube, officers handcuffed Watkins and his cameraman was forced to end the stream. Watkins claimed that he had been placed in jail and that Adin Ross had to bail him out, allowing him to return to streaming on August 11. Also in August 2022, he attempted to cheat in a "United States and Global Economics" course he was taking at the Ohio Digital Learning School by asking his viewers for the answers to his quiz. His viewers instead took the opportunity to prank him and purposely give him the wrong answers, resulting in him getting 0/10 on the test. 

In September 2022, he played in the Sidemen Charity Football Match. During the match, he became frustrated at referee Mark Clattenburg over being offside. He proceeded to whip him with the shirt he removed while celebrating, which resulted in him receiving a yellow card. Later in the match, a pitch invader carrying a Messi jersey approached Watkins, which resulted in Watkins tossing it onto the floor.  In November 2022, American rapper and singer Lil Nas X made his live streaming debut and appeared on IShowSpeed's stream.

In December 2022, he won the Streamy Award in the "Breakout Streamer" category during the 12th Streamy Awards.

Throughout November and December 2022, Watkins visited various football stadiums to try and watch Ronaldo play live. Watkins traveled to Old Trafford, Craven Cottage, and various other stadiums in Qatar. However his idol, Ronaldo was benched from the lineup during those games, up until Portugal’s loss to Morocco.

Musical career 
In August 2021, Watkins released his first single, "Dooty Booty", on his YouTube channel. Following its upload, the song quickly became popular on YouTube and other social media sites such as TikTok. In November 2021, Watkins released a single titled "Shake" which received over 160 million views on YouTube. In June 2022, he released a song called "Ronaldo (Sewey)", following his newfound admiration for Cristiano Ronaldo. In November 2022, he released a single titled "World Cup"  under Warner Records in honor of the 2022 FIFA World Cup.

Controversies
In December 2021, Watkins partook part in a Twitch "e-dating" livestream show hosted by Adin Ross. The exchange between Watkins and another participant, Ash Kash, escalated to what was widely interpreted as a rape threat. Watkins was the second contestant to be eliminated, and shortly after the game had ended, he quickly rejoined the Discord call and started sexually harassing Kash, slurring her repeatedly. Watkins was kicked out of the call again, with Ross apologizing to Kash for his behavior. Watkins was later banned from Twitch. According to a Twitter post by him, Watkins was banned for "sexual coercion or intimidation."

In April 2022, an old clip of Watkins playing Valorant on a live stream surfaced. In the clip, he tells a female player to, "Get off the fucking game and do your husband's dishes." This resulted in one of the game's producers, Sara Dadafshar, permanently banning Watkins from Valorant and all other Riot Games titles. YouTube global head of gaming creators, Lester Chen, replied to the clip, saying he was "on it." Watkins soon apologized for his behavior, acknowledged that it was "wrong", and explained that he had received racist comments from other players that day.

In July 2022, Watkins received a community guidelines strike as well as a 1-week ban on YouTube after livestreaming his character being fellated in a mod named "Jenny's Mod" on Minecraft to over 90,000 of his viewers. Initially, he censored the screen as it was happening, but accidentally uncensored it, showing him expressing sexual activity. Watkins later confirmed the strike and claimed that he wouldn't be returning to YouTube, but accused internet reporter Jake Luckey for having a vendetta against him for reporting on the incident.

In November 2022, Sky Sports announced that they would stop featuring him on their platform after the emergence of past misogynist and derogatory comments made by Watkins. The platform also removed all content featuring Watkins. Also in November 2022, Watkins' viewers accused him of promoting an alleged cryptocurrency scam during a promotional stream where he wore branded attire from a cryptocurrency-centered open-world video game.

In December 2022, Watkins garnered controversy for his behavior toward a Chinese spectator of the 2022 FIFA World Cup in Qatar, which was interpreted by many as racist. During a live stream, he approached a man wearing an Argentina top to question him. Visibly confused, the man specified that he did not speak English which prompted Watkins to start repeatedly hurling "Konnichiwa", a Japanese greeting, and start uttering sounds reminiscent of Cantonese and Mandarin language. When a clip of the live stream started circulating online, he uploaded an apology video to his Twitter account.

Discography

Filmography

Awards and nominations

References

External links 
 
 

2005 births
2016 establishments in the United States
21st-century African-American male singers
21st-century American rappers
African-American male singer-songwriters
African-American male rappers
American video bloggers
American YouTubers
Anti–East Asian sentiment in the United States
English-language YouTube channels
Gaming YouTubers
Living people
People from Cincinnati
Rappers from Cincinnati
Sexual harassment in the United States
Singers from Cincinnati
Singer-songwriters from Ohio
Social media influencers
Trap musicians
Twitch (service) streamers
Victims of cyberbullying
YouTube channels launched in 2016
YouTube controversies